Paraptilotus is a genus of flies belonging to the family Lesser Dung flies.

Species
P. brunneisternum Richards, 1938
P. chaetosoma Richards, 1938
P. discontinuus (Richards, 1954)
P. flavipes Richards, 1938
P. nitidissimus (Richards, 1951)
P. pallidus Richards, 1965
P. rufescens Richards, 1965
P. senecionis Richards, 1957
P. tricolor Richards, 1965

References

Sphaeroceridae
Diptera of Africa
Brachycera genera